The Billboard Liberation Front practices culture jamming via altering billboards by changing key words to radically alter the message, often to an anti-corporate message.   It started in San Francisco in 1977.

Advertising executives informed Jill Posener, author of Spray it Loud (1982), that the executives designed billboards to attract attacks because the changes drew attention to the products.  The BLF were aware of this possibility and considered invoicing advertisers including Chiat Day for the BLF's work.

In 2013, Complex Magazine named the BLF #27 of The 50 Most Influential Street Artists of All Time.

Cooperation 

The BLF cooperated with a range of other art groups, like Guerrilla Girls, monochrom and Joey Skaggs.

See also

Billboard Utilising Graffitists Against Unhealthy Promotions

References

External links
 Billboard Liberation Front Creative Group
 Interview with Jack Napier of the Billboard Liberation Front
 Interview with Jack Napier on Bombing science
San Francisco Chronicle
Salon.com
Adweek
LA Weekly

Cacophony Society
Culture jamming
Anti-consumerist groups
Graffiti in the United States
1977 establishments in California
Organizations based in San Francisco
Culture of San Francisco